HMS Flying Fox is a Royal Naval Reserve unit located in Bristol, England. Training over 100 reservists on Thursday evenings in Bristol, Flying Fox serves Bristol, Dorset, Devon, Somerset, Wiltshire and Gloucestershire.

History 
Bristol Division was one of the five divisions of the Royal Naval Volunteer Reserve formed in 1903. After the First World War the division was reformed and a new drill ship, the  sloop , was berthed at Bristol in 1924. Renamed Severn Division after the Second World War, HMS Flying Fox moved ashore to its present HQ in 1972. The ship itself was towed down the River Avon and across the Bristol Channel to a ship breaker's yard in Cardiff in 1973.

Co-located on the site in Winterstoke Road are the Naval Regional Officer for Wales and West of England, and the South West Area Sea Cadet HQ.

References

External links 

 HMS Flying Fox home page
 Flying Fox Association

 

Royal Navy shore establishments
Buildings and structures in Bristol
Military installations established in 1972